Darius Grazian Buia (born 30 April 1994) is a Romanian footballer who plays as a midfielder for Gloria Bistrița-Năsăud.

Personal life
Darius Buia is the son of former Romanian international Romulus Buia.

References

External links

1994 births
Living people
Footballers from Antwerp
Romanian footballers
Association football midfielders
Liga I players
Liga II players
Liga III players
FC Dinamo București players
LPS HD Clinceni players
FC UTA Arad players
CS Sportul Snagov players
ACS Viitorul Târgu Jiu players
FC Petrolul Ploiești players
CS Gloria Bistrița-Năsăud footballers